Charles G. Bilezikian (c. 1937 - July 26, 2016) was an American businessman, retail executive and philanthropist, who co-founded the Christmas Tree Shops retail chain with his wife, Doreen, in 1970.

Early life and education
Bilezikian was born to Armenian parents Beatrice (née Kasparian) and Krikor Bilezikian. His father, a tailor, died when he was a teenager. Following her husband's death, Bilezikian's mother took a job as a clerk in a Grover Cronin store in Waltham, Massachusetts. Charles Bilezikian graduated from Newton High School in Newton, Massachusetts. He received his bachelor's degree from Suffolk University. He entered the retail business soon after college and married his wife, Doreen Portnoy.

Career
Christmas Tree Shops grew to 23 retail locations by 2003, the year the Bilezikian family sold the chain to Bed Bath & Beyond for an estimated $200 million. Charles Bilezikian soon created the Bilezikian Family Foundation to pursue philanthropic efforts. Charles Bilezikian also served on the board of directors for the Armenian Missionary Association of America, where he helped refurbish a hospital and create a dental clinic, kindergarten, and a community center.

Later life
Charles and Doreen Bilezikian lived simultaneously in both Osterville, Massachusetts, and Palm Beach, Florida, during his later life. Charles Bilezikian died from pancreatic cancer at his home in Osterville, Massachusetts, on July 26, 2016, at the age of 79. He was survived by his wife of 52 years, and two sons, Jeffrey and Gregory. He was buried in Newton Cemetery in Newton, Massachusetts.

References

1930s births
2016 deaths
Retail company founders
American company founders
American business executives
American people of Armenian descent
Suffolk University alumni
People from Newton, Massachusetts
People from Osterville, Massachusetts
People from Palm Beach, Florida
20th-century American businesspeople
21st-century American businesspeople
21st-century philanthropists
Businesspeople from Massachusetts
Businesspeople from Florida
Philanthropists from Massachusetts
Philanthropists from Florida
Deaths from pancreatic cancer
Deaths from cancer in Massachusetts